Parvati Temple is a temple dedicated to the goddess Parvati, consort of Shiva.

This structure is one of the monuments among Khajuraho Group of Monuments, a World Heritage Site in India.

Location
The temple is located in the Western Group of Temple Complex Khajuraho. Inside the temple complex, it is located south-west to Vishvanath Temple.

Khajuraho is a small village in Chattarpur District of Madhya Pradesh, India.

Architecture 
It has heavily restored small sanctum. The porch is completely lost and of the sanctum only the plinth has survived.

The arch above sanctum door depicts sculpture of Brahma, Vishnu and Shiva. Also numerous erotic sculptures of couples can be seen on the front wall (on the side of sanctum door.

The side and back walls do not have any sculptures.

Gallery

References

External links 

 M.P. Tourism Website, Official Website of Madhya Pradesh State Tourism Corporation, Khajuraho
 Archaeological Survey of India, Bhopal Division, Index Page for Khajuraho - Chhatarpur 
 Archaeological Survey of India, Bhopal Division, Parvati Temple, Khajuraho

Bundelkhand
Monuments and memorials in Madhya Pradesh
World Heritage Sites in Madhya Pradesh
Hindu temples in Khajuraho